The 2009 Guzzini Challenger was a professional tennis tournament played on Hard courts. This was the sixth edition of the tournament which is part of the 2009 ATP Challenger Tour. It took place in Recanati, Italy between 20 July and 26 July 2009. In the singles competition, Horacio Zeballos chose to not defend his 2008 title. Stéphane Bohli defeated Andrey Golubev in the final 6–4, 7–6(4).

Seeds

Draw

Final four

Top half

Bottom half

References
 Main Draw
 Qualifying Draw

Guzzini Challenger - Singles
Guzzini Challenger